Gabriel Wallmark (born 21 January 2002) is a Swedish athlete who specializes in the triple jump. He was the gold medallist at the World Athletics U20 Championships in 2021 and at the European Athletics U20 Championships as well as the Swedish Senior National Championships 2021.

References

External links 

 Gabriel Wallmark at World Athletics
 Gabriel Wallmark at Friidrottsstatistik.se

2002 births
Living people
Swedish male triple jumpers
World Athletics U20 Championships winners